Miklós Todoresku was a Hungarian fencer. He competed in the men's sabre event at the 1900 Summer Olympics.

References

External links
 

Year of birth missing
Year of death missing
Hungarian male sabre fencers
Olympic fencers of Hungary
Fencers at the 1900 Summer Olympics
Place of birth missing
Place of death missing